is a train station located in Dazaifu, Japan.

Lines 

Nishi-Nippon Railroad
Tenjin Ōmuta Line

Platforms

Adjacent stations 

|-

References

Railway stations in Fukuoka Prefecture
Railway stations in Japan opened in 1924
Buildings and structures in Dazaifu, Fukuoka